David Mirra (born 20 March 1991) is a former professional Australian rules footballer who played for the Hawthorn Football Club in the Australian Football League (AFL). Following his AFL career, he joined Collegians Football Club in the VAFA competition.

VFL career

In his first season with the club, he played just one senior game, spending the rest of the season playing in the development team which won the premiership. From 2011 onward, Mirra was a regular senior player for Box Hill. He became a solid and dependable defender and had been selected for the VFL in state representative matches on three occasions. In 2013, Mirra led Box Hill to a grand final win after club captain, Daniel Pratt, was unable to play because of injury. He has been named in the VFL team of the year four times and won the club best and fairest in 2016 having previously been runner-up on four occasions.

To the end of the 2019 season; Mirra has played 155 senior games for Box Hill and captained the side for four seasons from 2014 to 2017.  He has captained the Box Hill Hawks in 78 matches, a club record.

AFL career
Mirra was drafted by Hawthorn with their second selection and twenty-third overall in the 2018 rookie draft. He made his AFL debut in the sixty-seven point win against  at the Melbourne Cricket Ground in round four of the 2018 season. He was promoted to the main list at the end of the season.

Statistics 

|- style=background:#EAEAEA
| 2018 ||  || 32
| 7 || 0 || 0 || 77 || 38 || 115 || 40 || 10 || 0.0 || 0.0 || 11.0 || 5.4 || 16.4 || 5.7 || 1.4 || 0
|-
| 2019 ||  || 32
| 4 || 0 || 0 || 46 || 24 || 70 || 23 || 12 || 0.0 || 0.0 || 11.5 || 6.0 || 17.5 || 5.8 || 3.0 || 0
|- class="sortbottom"
! colspan=3| Career
! 11 !! 0 !! 0 !! 123 !! 62 !! 185 !! 63 !! 22 !! 0.0 !! 0.0 !! 11.2 !! 5.6 !! 16.8 !! 5.7 !! 2.0 !! 0
|}

Honours and achievements
Team
 2× VFL premiership player: 2013, 2018
 Minor premiership: 2015

Individual
 VFL premiership captain: 2013
 Norm Goss Memorial Medal: 2018
 2× Col Austen Trophy: 2016, 2019
 3× VFL Representative: 2013, 2014, 2016
 4× VFL Team of the Year: 2011, 2013, 2014, 2015

References

External links

1991 births
Living people
Hawthorn Football Club players
Box Hill Football Club players
Australian rules footballers from Victoria (Australia)
Eastern Ranges players